Grace Ethel Cecile Rosalie Allen (July 26, 1895 – August 27, 1964) was an American vaudevillian, singer, actress, and comedian who became internationally famous as the zany partner and comic foil of husband George Burns, her straight man, appearing with him on radio, television and film as the duo Burns and Allen.

For her contributions to the television industry, Allen was honored with a star on the Hollywood Walk of Fame at 6672 Hollywood Boulevard. She and Burns were inducted into the Television Hall of Fame in 1988.

Costar Bea Benaderet said of Allen in 1966: "She was probably one of the greatest actresses of our time."

Early life
Allen was born in San Francisco, California, to George Allen and Margaret Theresa ("Molly") Allen (née Darragh; later Mrs. Edward Pidgeon), who were both of Irish Catholic descent. She made her first appearance on stage at age three, and was given her first role on the radio by Eddie Cantor. She graduated from Star of the Sea Convent School in 1914, and during that time became a talented dancer.

She soon began performing Irish folk dances with her three sisters, who were billed as "The Four Colleens". In 1909, Allen joined her sister, Bessie, as a vaudeville performer. At a performance in 1922, Allen met George Burns, and the two formed a comedy act. They were married on January 7, 1926, onstage at the Palace Theatre in Cleveland by a justice of the peace.

Allen was born with heterochromia, giving her two different color eyes; one blue and one green.

Birthdate myth

Some discrepancy exists as to her date of birth. Depending on the source, Allen is alleged to have been born on July 26 in 1895, 1896, 1902, or 1906. All public vital records held by the city and county of San Francisco were destroyed in the earthquake and great fire of April 1906. Her husband George Burns professed not to know exactly how old she was, though it was presumably he who provided the date of July 26, 1902 that appears on her death record. Allen's crypt marker also shows her year of birth as 1902.

Among Allen's signature jokes was a dialogue in which she would claim that she was born in 1906. Her foil would press her for proof or corroborating information, and she would reply that her birth certificate had been destroyed in the earthquake. Her foil would point out that she was born in July, but that the earthquake was three months earlier in April. Allen would simply smile and reply: "Well, it was an awfully big earthquake."

Presumably the most reliable information comes from U.S. Census data collected on June 1, 1900 that shows Grace Allen, age four (born in July 1895), along with her parents and five siblings. This proves that Allen was born before 1900 and indicates that the birthdate of July 26, 1895 may be correct. Additionally, her senior year high school year book has been located.

Double act

The Burns and Allen act began with Allen as the straight man, setting up Burns to deliver the punchlines and receive the laughs. In his book Gracie: A Love Story, Burns explained that he had noticed that Allen's straight lines were bringing more laughs than did his punchlines, so he cannily flipped the act, making himself the straight man so that Allen would elicit the laughter. Audiences immediately fell in love with Allen's character, which combined the traits of naivete, zaniness and innocence. The reformulated team, focusing on Allen, toured the country, eventually headlining in major vaudeville houses. Many of their famous routines were preserved in one- and two-reel short films, including Lambchops (1929), made while the couple was still performing on the stage.

Burns attributed all of the couple's early success to Allen, ignoring his own brilliance as a straight man. He summarized their act by saying: "All I had to do was say, 'Gracie, how's your brother?' and she talked for 38 years. And sometimes I didn't even have to remember to say 'Gracie, how's your brother?'"

Radio
In the early 1930s, like many stars of the era, Burns and Allen graduated to radio. The show was originally a continuation of the flirtation act from their vaudeville and short-film routines. Burns realized that they were too old for that type of material and changed the show's format in the fall of 1941 into the situation comedy for which they are best remembered: a working showbusiness married couple negotiating ordinary problems caused by Gracie's "illogical logic", usually with the help of neighbors Harry and Blanche Morton and their announcer Bill Goodwin (later replaced by Harry von Zell during the run of their television series).

Publicity stunts

Burns and Allen frequently used running gags as publicity stunts. During 1932–33, they pulled off one of the most successful in the business: a year-long search for Allen's supposedly missing brother. They would make unannounced cameo appearances on other shows, asking if anyone had seen Allen's brother. However, her brother did not find it comical and eventually asked them to stop; he was so irked by the gag's popularity that he disappeared from society at the height of its popularity.

In 1940, Allen announced that she was running for president of the United States on the Surprise Party ticket. Burns and Allen embarked on a cross-country whistle-stop campaign tour on a private train, performing their live radio show in various cities. In one of her campaign speeches, Gracie said, "I don't know much about the Lend-Lease Bill, but if we owe it we should pay it." Another typical quip on the campaign trail was: "Everybody knows a woman is better than a man when it comes to introducing bills into the house." The Surprise Party mascot was the kangaroo, and its motto was "It's in the bag." As part of the gag, Dwell, Sloan and Pearce published a book, How to Become President by Gracie Allen (in reality, written by Burns and Allen writer Charles Lofgren) that included photographs from their nationwide campaign tour and the Surprise Party convention. Allen received an endorsement from Harvard University.

Allen was also the subject of one of S. S. Van Dine's Philo Vance mystery novels, The Gracie Allen Murder Case. Allen said: "S.S. Van Dine is silly to spend six months writing a novel when you can buy one for $2.95."

In another publicity stunt, Allen played a piano concerto at the Hollywood Bowl (and later at Carnegie Hall). The Burns and Allen staff hired a composer to write the "Concerto for Index Finger", a joke piece in which the orchestra would play madly, only to pause while Allen played a one-finger scale with a final incorrect note. The orchestra would then play a musical piece that developed around the wrong note. On her final solo, Allen would finally hit the right note, causing the entire orchestra to applaud. The actual index-finger playing was performed offstage by a professional pianist. The concerto was featured in the film Two Girls and a Sailor (1944) with an orchestra conducted by Albert Coates.

Films

In the early 1930s, Burns and Allen appeared in several short films in which they performed some of their classic vaudeville routines. They also appeared in two full-length movies with W. C. Fields: International House (1933) and Six of a Kind (1934). Burns and Allen also appeared in three out of the four Big Broadcast ensemble comedies including The Big Broadcast (1932) with Bing Crosby, The Big Broadcast of 1936 (1935) with Crosby, and The Big Broadcast of 1937 (1936) with Jack Benny. They were also in We're Not Dressing (1934), billed directly under Crosby and Carole Lombard.

In 1937, Burns and Allen starred with Fred Astaire in A Damsel in Distress, a musical with an original score by George Gershwin that introduced the song "A Foggy Day". It was Astaire's first RKO film without dancing partner Ginger Rogers. Astaire's costar Joan Fontaine was not a dancer, and he was reluctant to dance on screen alone. He also felt the script needed more comic relief to enhance the overall appeal of the film. Burns and Allen had each worked in vaudeville as dancers before forming their act, and when word of the project reached them, they called Astaire and he asked them to audition. Burns contacted an act whom he had once seen performing a dance using small whisk brooms. For the next several weeks, he and Allen practiced the complicated routine for their audition. When they presented the dance to Astaire, he liked it so much that he asked them teach it to him, and it was added to the film with the three of them dancing together. Burns and Allen also matched Astaire step-by-step in the film's demandingly epic dance sequence in a funhouse including amazing visuals with distorted mirrors.

Their next film the following year was College Swing (1938) starring Burns and Allen top-billed above Martha Raye and Bob Hope with a stellar supporting cast featuring Edward Everett Horton, Betty Grable, Jackie Coogan, John Payne, Robert Cummings, and Jerry Colonna. The picture was directed by Raoul Walsh.

A lively musical comedy came next titled Honolulu (1939) starring Eleanor Powell, Robert Young and Burns and Allen billed above the title. Unusually, Burns and Allen performed separately through most of the film until the end, with Allen singing and dancing the energetic titular song with Powell at one point while Burns is off-screen.

That same year, Allen's popularity was such that S.S. Van Dine wrote one of his Philo Vance detective novels featuring her as the principal character titled The Gracie Allen Murder Case. The zanily comedic book was adapted into a film,  also titled The Gracie Allen Murder Case (1939). Allen was billed above Warren William (the actor then portraying Philo Vance in the series of Vance films), and without Burns. The result was so successful that Allen was cast two years later in a similar mystery/comedy film titled Mr. and Mrs. North (1942) in which she is top-billed as a comedic detective, again without Burns in the cast. 
 
Allen made her last film appearance in a musical cameo as an amusing concert pianist in Two Girls and a Sailor, without Burns, but remained in radio and would segue into series television with her husband six years later.

Television

In the fall of 1949, having apparently put their movie career behind them but working continuously in radio, Burns and Allen became part of the CBS talent raid. Their good friend and frequent guest star Jack Benny had already departed NBC for CBS, and CBS head William S. Paley made it clear that he believed that talent, not the network, made the difference, which was not the case at NBC. Benny convinced Burns and Allen (among others) to join him in the move to CBS. The Burns and Allen radio show became part of the CBS lineup, and a year later, they also brought their show to television as The George Burns and Gracie Allen Show. They continued to use the formula that had kept them longtime radio stars, playing themselves only now as television stars, still living next door to Harry and Blanche Morton. They concluded each show with a brief dialogue performance in the style of their classic vaudeville and earlier radio routines.

Allen retired in 1958, and Burns tried to continue without her. The show was renamed The George Burns Show with the cast intact except for Allen. The show's setting was changed from the Burns home to his office, with Blanche working as Burns' secretary so that she could help Allen keep an eye on him. The renamed show barely lasted a year.

"Say good night, Gracie"
During their vaudeville routine, and later on radio and television, as their show ended, Burns would look at Allen and say "Say good night, Gracie," to which she would usually simply reply "Good night." A popular legend holds that she would reply "Good night, Gracie," but according to Burns, recordings of their radio and television shows and several histories of old-time radio (such as John Dunning's On the Air: The Encyclopedia of Old-Time Radio), she never used the phrase.

Private life

In the 1930s, Burns and Allen adopted two children, Sandra Jean and Ronald Jon, after discovering that they could not conceive on their own. They agreed to raise the children as Catholics and to permit them to make their own religious choices as adults. Ronnie eventually joined the cast of his parents' television show, playing their son, a serious drama student who disdains comedy. Sandy made only occasional appearances on the show (usually as a telephone operator, waitress, secretary or clerk), and left showbusiness to become a teacher.

As a child, Allen had been scalded badly on one arm, and she was extremely sensitive about the scarring. Throughout her life, she wore long or three-quarter length sleeves to hide the scars, and the half-forearm style became her trademark. When the couple moved to Beverly Hills and acquired a swimming pool, Allen wore a bathing suit and swam the length of the pool to prove to her children that she could swim; she had taken swimming lessons to fight a longtime fear of drowning. She never again wore a bathing suit or entered the pool.

Allen was said to be sensitive about having one green eye and one blue eye (heterochromia), and some speculation existed that plans to film the eighth season of The Burns & Allen Show in color prompted her retirement, but this seems unlikely as a color episode was filmed and broadcast in 1954 (a clip of the episode was included in a CBS anniversary show). Allen retired in 1958 for health reasons; Burns repeatedly noted that she had continued with the television show as long as she did in order to please him, in spite of her health problems.

In later years, Burns admitted that he had a very brief extramarital affair. Stricken by guilt, he phoned Jack Benny and told him about the indiscretion, but Allen overheard the conversation and Burns quietly bought her an expensive centerpiece. Nothing more was said, but years later, Burns discovered that Allen had subsequently told one of her friends about the affair, finishing with, "You know, I really wish George would cheat on me again. I could use a new centerpiece." Burns also said that he spent $10,000 on a diamond ring for Gracie upon the cessation of the affair, with Allen years later remarking to a friend that she had wished that Burns would have another affair because she needed another ring.

Death

Allen, who had a history of heart disease, died from a heart attack in Hollywood on August 27, 1964 at age 62 (later found to be 69 according to census records). Her remains were interred in a crypt at the Freedom Mausoleum in the Sanctuary of Heritage at Forest Lawn Memorial Park, Glendale, California.

Burns' remains were interred at her side in 1996 when he died at the age of 100. The marker on the crypt was changed from "Grace Allen Burns—Beloved Wife And Mother (1895–1964)" to "Gracie Allen (1895–1964) and George Burns (1896–1996)—Together Again".

Filmography
 Lambchops (1929; short) as Gracie the Girlfriend
 The Big Broadcast (1932; first feature film) as Gracie
 International House (1933) as Nurse Allen
 College Humor (1933) as Herself
 Six of a Kind (1934) as Gracie Devore
 We're Not Dressing (1934) as Gracie
 Many Happy Returns (1934, first leading role) as Herself
 Love in Bloom (1935) as Gracie Downey
 Here Comes Cookie (1935) as Herself
 The Big Broadcast of 1936 (1935) as Herself
 The Big Broadcast of 1937 (1936) as Mrs. Platt
 College Holiday (1936) as Calliope 'Gracie' Dove
 A Damsel in Distress (1937) as Gracie
 College Swing (1938) as Gracie Alden
 Honolulu (1939) as Millie De Grasse
 The Gracie Allen Murder Case (1939; without George Burns – a "Philo Vance" mystery by S. S. Van Dine) as Herself
 Mr. and Mrs. North (1941; second murder mystery film without Burns) as Pamela North
 Two Girls and a Sailor (1944, guest appearance without Burns; last movie role) as Herself

Radio series
 The Robert Burns Panatella Show: 1932–1933, CBS
 The White Owl Program: 1933–1934, CBS
 The Adventures of Gracie: 1934–1935, CBS
 The Campbell's Tomato Juice Program: 1935–1937, CBS
 The Grape Nuts Program: 1937–1938, NBC
 The Chesterfield Program: 1938–1939, CBS
 The Hinds Honey and Almond Cream Program: 1939–1940, CBS
 The Hormel Program: 1940–1941, NBC
 The Swan Soap Show: 1941–1945, NBC, CBS
 Maxwell House Coffee Time: 1945–1949, NBC
 The Amm-i-Dent Toothpaste Show: 1949–1950, CBS

Gracie Award
The Gracie Award is presented by the Alliance for Women in Media to recognize exemplary programming created by women, for women and about women in radio, television, cable and web-based media, including news, drama, comedy, commercials, public service, documentary and sports. The awards program encourages the realistic and multifaceted portrayal of women in entertainment, news, features and other programs. Allen has twice been nominated to the National Women's Hall of Fame, though she has not been inducted. She has been honored by James L. Brooks, who named Gracie Films after her.

See also

 The George Burns and Gracie Allen Show, 1950–58, CBS

References

Further reading
 
 Gracie a Love Story by George Burns (New York: G.P. Putnam, 1988) 
 The Great American Broadcast by Leonard Maltin (New York: Dutton, 1997) 
 I Love Her, That's Why!: An Autobiography by George Burns (1955, 2003, 2011) 
 Mcclintock, Walter. Current Biography Yearbook: 1951. Place of publication not identified: H W Wilson, 1951. 
 On the Air: The Encyclopedia of Old-Time Radio by John Dunning (New York: Oxford University Press, 1998) 
 Say Goodnight, Gracie: The Story of Burns and Allen by Cheryl Blythe and Susan Sackett (1986, 1989) 
 Revised and Updated (2016) Amazon eBook 
 The Third Time Around by George Burns (New York: Putnam, 1980), including transcripts of several classic Burns & Allen routines.

External links

 
 
 
 Home of George Burns & Gracie Allen-Radio Television Mirror – December 1940 (page 17)

 
1895 births
1964 deaths
20th-century American actresses
Actresses from Los Angeles
Actresses from San Francisco
Age controversies
American female dancers
Dancers from California
American film actresses
American people of Irish descent
American radio actresses
American stage actresses
Television personalities from Los Angeles
American women television personalities
American women comedians
Burials at Forest Lawn Memorial Park (Glendale)
Female candidates for President of the United States
Candidates in the 1940 United States presidential election
Vaudeville performers
20th-century American singers
Comedians from California
20th-century American women singers
20th-century American comedians